Alibijaban is a small island located off the southeastern coast of Bondoc Peninsula in the Philippines. It belongs administratively to the municipality of San Andres, Quezon province, and is coterminous with the barangay of the same name. With a population of 1,643 inhabitants in 2015, it is the smallest of seven barangays in San Andres.

The island is known for its pristine mangrove forest and coral reefs. It is also visited for its white sandy beaches and rich bird life.

Description
It is a low-lying island surrounded by a fringing reef which is interspersed with seagrass beds near the shore. The island's central and northern interior are dominated by mangrove wilderness, with most of the population concentrated on two sitios on the island's western and southwestern coast facing San Andres and Bondoc Peninsula. Its coastal formations include sandy beaches and rocky shores, particularly in its northeastern side.

The island is accessible via motorized banca from the port of San Andres.

Conservation

Alibajaban has some of the most undisturbed mangrove wilderness in the Philippines. It hosts at least 22 mangrove species and 14 species of birds, including the Tabon scrubfowl, white-collared kingfisher, jungle crow, black-naped oriole, Philippine collared dove, Asian glossy starling, chestnut munia, Philippine pied fantail, common emerald dove, black-crowned night heron, common snipe. It also supports a number of fruit bats and monitor lizards. Since the establishment on the island of a wilderness protected area in 1981, the Community Environment and Resources Office (CENRO) under the Department of Environment and Natural Resources and Provincial Government of Quezon now administers the area.

The island also has the most diverse marine habitat in the region of Ragay Gulf. It is home to at least 30 genera of hard coral dominated by Porites, Montipora and Acropora. Its adjacent waters are visited by whale sharks, manta rays, and pawikans (marine turtles). The passage of a municipal ordinance in 2006 prohibited all kinds of fishing in the area.

Tourism
Alibijaban is an emerging backpacker destination. It's fine white sand beach and mangrove forest are few of the reasons why backpackers visit the island. The activities to do include: beach bumming, camping, boating, and snorkeling.

References

External links

Islands of Quezon
Barangays of Quezon
Wilderness areas of the Philippines